The 19057 / 19058 Udhna–Banaras Express is an Express train of Indian Railways connecting  and . The train was introduced in rail budget 2012–13.

It operates as train number 19057 from Udhna Junction to Banaras and as train number 19058 in the reverse direction, serving the states of Gujarat, Maharashtra, Madhya Pradesh and Uttar Pradesh.

Coaches

The 19057 / 58 Udhna–Banaras Express has 1 AC 2 tier, 1 AC 3 tier, 8 Sleeper class, 6 General Unreserved & 2 SLR (Seating cum Luggage Rake) coaches. It does not carry a pantry car.

As is customary with most train services in India, coach composition may be amended at the discretion of Indian Railways depending on demand.

Service

19057 Udhna–Banaras Express covers the distance of 1402 km in 26 hours 50 mins (52 km/hr) & in 28 hours 10 mins as 19058 Banaras–Udhna Express. (51 km/hr).

As the average speed of the train is below , as per Indian Railways rules, its fare doesn't include a Superfast surcharge.

Route & Halts

The important halts of the train are:

Traction

The entire route is now fully electrified. Both trains are hauled by a Vadodara Loco Shed-based WAP-5 locomotive from Udhna Junction to Banaras, and vice versa.

Timings

19057 Udhna–Banaras Express leaves Udhna Junction every Friday at 22:50 PM IST and reaches Banaras at 01:40 AM IST on Sunday.

19058 Banaras–Udhna Express leaves Banaras every Sunday at 04:50 AM IST and reaches Udhna Junction at 09:00 AM IST the next day.

Rake sharing

The train shares its rake with 19063/19064 Udhna–Danapur Express.

See also

 Tapti Ganga Express
 Surat–Muzaffarpur Express
 Surat–Bhagalpur Express

References

Express trains in India
Rail transport in Gujarat
Rail transport in Madhya Pradesh
Rail transport in Maharashtra
Railway services introduced in 2012
Passenger trains originating from Varanasi
Transport in Surat